Kwon Oh-hee (born 18 June 1978) is a South Korean tennis player.

Kwon has a career high ATP singles ranking of 288 achieved on 12 June 2006 and a career high ATP doubles ranking of 452, achieved on 26 May 2008. Kwon has won eleven ITF singles titles and fourteen ITF doubles titles.

Kwon has represented South Korea at the Davis Cup, where he has a win–loss record of 3–1.

External links

1978 births
Living people
South Korean male tennis players
Tennis players at the 2002 Asian Games
Medalists at the 2002 Asian Games
Asian Games medalists in tennis
Asian Games bronze medalists for South Korea
21st-century South Korean people